Radko Knoll (‘Radkova Mogila’ \'rad-ko-va mo-'gi-la\) is a rocky hill rising to 102 m on the north coast of Smyadovo Cove in the northwest of Rugged Island in the South Shetland Islands, Antarctica.  It is situated 830 m south-southeast of Cape Sheffield and 860 m north-northeast of Ugain Point.

The knoll is named for Ivan ‘Radko’ Mihaylov (1896–1990), leader of the Bulgarian liberation movement in Macedonia.

Location
Spanish mapping in 1992 and Bulgarian in 2009.

Maps
 Península Byers, Isla Livingston. Mapa topográfico a escala 1:25000. Madrid: Servicio Geográfico del Ejército, 1992.
 L.L. Ivanov. Antarctica: Livingston Island and Greenwich, Robert, Snow and Smith Islands. Scale 1:120000 topographic map.  Troyan: Manfred Wörner Foundation, 2009.  
 Antarctic Digital Database (ADD). Scale 1:250000 topographic map of Antarctica. Scientific Committee on Antarctic Research (SCAR). Since 1993, regularly upgraded and updated.
 L.L. Ivanov. Antarctica: Livingston Island and Smith Island. Scale 1:100000 topographic map. Manfred Wörner Foundation, 2017.

References
 Radko Knoll. SCAR Composite Gazetteer of Antarctica.
 Bulgarian Antarctic Gazetteer. Antarctic Place-names Commission. (details in Bulgarian, basic data in English)

External links
 Radko Knoll. Copernix satellite image

Hills of the South Shetland Islands
Bulgaria and the Antarctic